Abelmoschus caillei, the West African okra, is a plant species in the family Malvaceae. It occurs in humid areas of West and Central Africa, where it is used as a vegetable. It originated as an allopolyploid hybrid of Abelmoschus esculentus and A. manihot, and is often mistaken for either of those two plants. It was officially described elevated to the status of a species in 1988. The same hybrid was produced experimentally in Japan where it is known as Abelmoschus glutino-textile.

Description

Abelmoschus caillei occurs as an erect and stout herb that is often woody at the base. Its flowers are axillary, with their petals yellow to pink. The plant is typically 60-65 inches tall (though it may reach 85 inches). The stems may be green, red, or green with some red pigmentation. The seeds are typically ovoid to oblong in shape, about 3-5 inches long, and may have a rough surface. The leaves are green and lobed, while petioles are typically purple.

Uses

Abelmoschus caillei is consumed as a vegetable in a variety of ways, with young leaves being consumed as spinach and young fruits being consumed after being cooked or fried. Its edibility combined with its resistance to yellow vein mosaic virus allows the plant to be commonly cultivated in subsistence farming in high rainfall areas of West Africa. Its leaves can also be used as cattle feed.

Intensive contact with the fruit and plant may cause skin irritation.

In Nigeria, the plant is used medicinally for sore throats and child bearing, as well as to make certain household items like rope and sponges.

References

External links
PROTAbase on Abelmoschus caillei

caillei
Flora of Africa